Realm of Man (Swedish: Människors rike) is a 1949 Swedish drama film directed by Gösta Folke and starring Ulf Palme, Anita Björk and Erik Hell. It is based on a novel of the same name by Sven Edvin Salje. The film's sets were designed by the art director Bibi Lindström. Location shooting took place around Jämshög.

Cast
 Ulf Palme as Kjell Arvid Loväng
 Anita Björk as Birgit Maria Larsson
 Erik Hell as Aron Loväng
 Ragnvi Lindbladh as Sonja Eriksson
 Märta Arbin as Inga Loväng
 Oscar Ljung as Andreasson
 Agneta Prytz as Edla
 Jan-Erik Lindqvist as Janne
 Artur Cederborgh as Måns-Erik Eriksson
 Ivar Kåge as Osbor, doctor
 Torsten Winge as Beck-Lasse
 Erik Strandell as Georg Larsson
 Artur Rolén as Stall-Jonte
 Sven Magnusson as Aron's fellow worker
 Nils Hultgren as Miller
 Harry Ahlin as Auctioneer
 Karl Olof Hallin as Vicar 
 Bertil Berglund as Torvidsson
 Adèle Lundvall as Margit
 Hugo Tranberg as Birgit's father
 Millan Bolander as Birgit's mother
 Gösta Ericsson as Engineer
 Hanny Schedin as Sonja's mother
 John W. Björling as Wedding guest 
 Ernst Brunman as Man at auction 
 Bengt Brunskog as Card player 
 Gösta Folke as Driver 
 Arne Källerud as Drunk man at the auction 
 Uno Larsson as Wedding guest 
 Walter Sarmell as Card player 
 John Zacharias as Veterinary

References

Bibliography 
 Qvist, Per Olov & von Bagh, Peter. Guide to the Cinema of Sweden and Finland. Greenwood Publishing Group, 2000.

External links 
 

1949 films
Swedish drama films
1949 drama films
1940s Swedish-language films
Films directed by Gösta Folke
Films based on Swedish novels
1940s Swedish films